The 2015 Judo Grand Slam Baku was held in Baku, Azerbaijan from 8 to 10 May 2015.

Medal summary

Men's events

Women's events

Source Results

Medal table

References

External links
 

2015 IJF World Tour
2015 Judo Grand Slam
Judo
Grand Slam Baku 2016
Judo
Judo